Stefan Wurz (born October 24, 1964 in Karlsruhe, Germany) is a German composer who specialises in musical theatre.

Biography 

Having trained as a classical pianist as well as being a keyboarder and songwriter for various rock bands in his youth, Stefan Wurz studied musicology and composition at Karlsruhe University, where he also published a thesis on femmes fatales in music theatre.

Wurz was the first composer to set the Aldous Huxley classic Brave New World to music in 1994. In 2003, he was commissioned by Czech producer Daniel Landa to create Rockquiem, a rock and dance spectacle based on Mozart's Requiem, which premiered in Prague and Bolzano and was subsequently produced in several European countries.
Current projects include The Virtual Mirror, a collaboration with German games creator Wolfgang Walk and American writer Mark Barrett.

Compositions

Musical Theatre 
 2016: The Virtual Mirror – Rock ’n’ Games Cross Over Opera (WIP)
 2010: Brandnacht - Jugendrockmusical
 2007: Trurls Elektrobarde based on Stanislaw Lem
 2006: Helle Nächte – romantic musical based on Fyodor Mikhailovich Dostoevsky's White Nights
 2003: Da Capo al Fine – a Splatter Opera
 2003: Rockquiem – based on W. A.Mozart
 1994: Schöne neue Welt – rock musical based on Aldous Huxley's Brave New World
 1993: Alice – rock musical after Lewis Carroll

Miscellaneous 
 2017:	Crossing Bridges for State Theatre Kassel
 2017:	Scherben und Papa Haydn - string quartets for Quartett PLUS 1
 2016:	Golden Dragon, Golden Snake - Aria und Dance for Anging Normal University, Anqing, Anhui, China 
 2015:	Time Changes - Concert for baglama, electric guitar, rockbound and orchestra
 2015:	Hannover Sounds - A Symphony of City Sounds for the State Opera House Hannover
 2015:	Pudiera ser...quizás - Tango for baritone and tango orchestra after lyrics by Mario Pinnola
 2012:	Baroque With You and Indian Smooth Criminal for voice and string quartet based on Songs performed by Michael Jackson
 2011:	Credo - a musical confrontation for church organ and electric guitar
 2011:	American Jesus Suite for string quartet based on Songs performed by Michael Jackson
 2008:	La Mariposa – tango nuevo
 2004	Tenorissimo – 4 compositions and arrangements for Saimir Pirgu
 2004	Martes Martes – miniature animated film opera
 2004	Heile Welt – short film by Klemens Brysch – film score
 2002:	Heaven Fears Freedom – animated film by Chrysis Lengen - film score
 1997:	Spieler (Gambler) – animated film by Jan Schönfelder – film score
 1992:	Rilke-Lieder – Seven Poems by Rainer Maria Rilke

External links 
Virtual Mirror on myspace
  (in German)

1964 births
Living people
German musical theatre composers